The table tennis event at the 2022 Mediterranean Games was held in Oran, Algeria, from 26 to 30 June 2022.

Medal table

Medalists

References

External links
 
Official site
Results book

Sports at the 2022 Mediterranean Games
2022
Mediterranean Games